Mark Korda is an Australian businessman and former president of the Collingwood Football Club. He is also co-founder of KordaMentha. Korda studied at Swinburne University of Technology and later received an honorary doctorate from the university.

Collingwood Football Club president
Korda was appointed to the board of directors at the Collingwood Football Club in May 2007, after five years at his company, KordaMentha. Following the resignation of long-time President Eddie McGuire, Korda, along with Peter Murphy, took over as interim Co-Presidents on February 10, 2021 until the announcement of the next President. Korda was announced as the thirteenth president of the Collingwood Football Club on 21 April 2021. Korda, having been in the role for less than a month, saw his vice president at Collingwood, Alex Waislitz, resign effective immediately. His vacancy was filled by two co-vice-presidents, Indigenous businesswoman Jodie Sizer and former Collingwood player Paul Licuria. Former cyclist and medical practitioner Bridie O'Donnell was appointed to the board following Waislitz's resignation. On 15 September 2021, having been on the Collingwood board for 120 days, O'Donnell resigned effective immediately, citing the magnitude of the role. On 6 October 2021, Korda announced his resignation as president, but remained in the role until 16 December 2021.

Notes

References

External links
 Korda at KordaMentha

 

Living people
Businesspeople from Melbourne
Australian chief executives
Collingwood Football Club administrators
Year of birth missing (living people)
Swinburne University of Technology alumni